Miriam Kolodziejová and Laura Ioana Paar were the defending champions, but Paar chose not to participate. Kolodziejová partnered Jesika Malečková but lost in the first round to Sonay Kartal and Katie Swan.

Mariam Bolkvadze and Maia Lumsden won the title, defeating Diāna Marcinkēviča and Conny Perrin in the final, 6–2, 6–3.

Seeds

Draw

Draw

References

External Links
Main Draw

Empire Women's Indoor 1 - Doubles